The National Science Board (NSB) of the United States establishes the policies of the National Science Foundation (NSF) within the framework of applicable national policies set forth by the president and the Congress. The NSB also serves as an independent policy advisory body to the president and Congress on science and engineering research and education issues. The board has a statutory obligation to "...render to the President and to the Congress reports on specific, individual policy matters related to science and engineering and education in science engineering, as Congress or the President determines the need for such reports," (e.g. Science and Engineering Indicators; Report to Congress on Mid-scale Instrumentation at the National Science Foundation). All board members are presidential appointees. NSF's director serves as an ex officio 25th member and is appointed by the president and confirmed by the US Senate.

Mission statement
The board's mission statement states: "Supporting education and research across all fields of science and technology and America's investment in the future."

Background
The National Science Board was created through the National Science Foundation Act of 1950: There is established in the executive branch of the Government an independent agency to be known as the National Science Foundation (hereinafter referred to as the "Foundation"). The Foundation shall consist of a National Science Board (hereinafter referred to as the "Board") and a Director.As an independent federal agency, NSF does not fall within a cabinet department; rather NSF's activities are guided by the National Science Board. The board was established by the Congress to serve as a national science policy body, and to oversee and guide the activities of NSF. It has dual responsibilities to: a) provide independent national science policy advice to the president and the Congress; and b) establish policies for NSF.

The board meets five times per year to review and approve major NSF awards and new programs, provide policy direction to NSF, and address significant science- and engineering-related national policy issues. It initiates and conducts studies and reports on a broad range of policy topics, and publishes policy papers or statements on issues of importance to U.S. science and engineering research and education enterprises. The board identifies issues that are critical to NSF's future, and approves NSF's strategic plan and the annual budget submission to the Office of Management and Budget (OMB). Specifically, the board analyzes NSF's budget to ensure progress and consistency in keeping with the strategic direction set for NSF and to ensure balance between new investments and core programs.

Composition
The president appoints 24 members of the National Science Board for six year terms. The NSF director serves as an ex officio 25th member. Every two years, one-third (eight) of the members rotate off the board and eight new members are appointed (or occasionally re-appointed) to serve six-year terms. Board member nominations are based on distinguished service and eminence in research, education and/or public service. Members are drawn from academia and industry, and represent a diverse range of science, technology, engineering, and education disciplines and geographic areas.

Current members

Terms expire May 10, 2024 
 Maureen L. Condic – Associate Professor of Neurobiology and Anatomy, University of Utah, School of Medicine 
 Suresh V. Garimella – President, University of Vermont
 Steven Leath – Former President, Auburn University
 Daniel A. Reed – NSB Chair | Senior Vice President for Academic Affairs (Provost) University of Utah 
 Geraldine L. Richmond – Presidential Chair in Science and Professor of Chemistry, University of Oregon
 S. Alan Stern – Associate Vice President and Special Assistant to the President, Southwest Research Institute
 Stephen H. Willard – CEO, NRx Pharmaceuticals, Inc.
 Maria T. Zuber – Vice President for Research, Massachusetts Institute of Technology

Terms expire May 10, 2026 
 Sudarsanam Suresh Babu – Director of Bredesen Center for Interdisciplinary Research and Graduate Education; Governor’s Chair of Advanced Manufacturing and Professor of Mechanical Engineering and Materials Science, Oak Ridge National Laboratory/University of Tennessee, Knoxville
 Roger N. Beachy – Professor Emeritus of Biology, Washington University in St. Louis
 Dario Gil – Director of IBM Research, IBM
 Aaron Dominguez – Provost and Professor of Physics, Catholic University of America, Washington, DC
 Melvyn E. Huff – Lecturer, University of Massachusetts, Dartmouth
 Heather A. Wilson – President, University of Texas, El Paso and former member of the United States House of Representatives

Terms expire May 10, 2028 
 Victor R. McCrary – NSB Vice Chair | Vice President for Research and Graduate Programs, University of the District of Columbia
 Julia M. Phillips – Executive Emeritus, Sandia National Laboratories

NSF Director and ex officio Member 
 Sethuraman Panchanathan – NSF Director; Executive Vice President and Chief Research and Innovation Officer of Knowledge Enterprise Development and Director of the Center for Cognitive Ubiquitous Computing, Arizona State University

A list of former NSB members can be found here.

Work of the National Science Board

The board has two overarching roles: 1) Provide oversight and policy guidance to the National Science Foundation; and 2) Serve as an advisor to Congress and the president on matters concerning science and engineering in the U.S.

Committees

The work of the National Science Board is generally done through its committees. By statute, the board has an Executive Committee and other committees. Specifically, the NSF Act of 1950, as amended, authorizes the board "to appoint from among its members such committees as it deems necessary, and to assign to committees so appointed such survey and advisory functions as the Board deems appropriate...."

Note: NSB Chair, NSB Vice Chair, and NSF Director are Members ex officio of all committees.

Standing committees 

 Executive Committee (EC)
 Committee on Oversight (CO)
 Committee on External Engagement (EE)
 Committee on Awards and Facilities (A&F)
 Committee on National Science and Engineering Policy (SEP)
 Committee on Strategy (CS)

Subcommittees, task forces, ad hoc committees, and archived committees

Science & Engineering Indicators (SEI) 

Science and Engineering Indicators (Indicators) provides high-quality quantitative information on the U.S. and international science and engineering (S&E) enterprise. Indicators consists of detailed thematic or focus area reports, a state data tool, and a congressionally mandated report delivered biennially to the president and Congress that highlights important trends from across the focus areas. Indicators reports employ a variety of presentation styles—such as narrative text, data tables, and figures—to provide accessible data to consumers with different information needs.

The data described in Indicators are a quantitative summary of the scope, quality, and vitality of the S&E enterprise over time and within a global context. These data are intended to contribute to an understanding of the current environment and to inform the development of future policies. The reports do not model the dynamics of the S&E enterprise nor forecast future outcomes. Also, Indicators is factual and policy neutral. It does not offer policy options nor make policy recommendations. The National Science Board authors one or more companion pieces that draw on the data in Indicators to offer recommendations related to national S&E research or education policy, in keeping with the Board’s statutory responsibility to bring attention to such issues.

Indicators is prepared under the guidance of the National Science Board by the National Center for Science and Engineering Statistics (NCSES), a principal federal statistical agency within the National Science Foundation (NSF), Social, Behavioral and Economic Sciences Directorate. NCSES develops the content and the dissemination platforms. Indicators reports are subject to extensive review by internal and external subject matter experts, federal agencies, National Science Board members, and NCSES statistical reviewers for accuracy, coverage, and balance.

More can be found here: https://ncses.nsf.gov/indicators/about

NSB Policy One-Pagers

The most recent NSB Policy One-Pagers can be found here:
https://www.nsf.gov/nsb/publications/onepagers.jsp

Honorary awards

Each year, the board honors achievement and public service in science, engineering, and technology through its two honorary awards, the Vannevar Bush Award and the NSB Science and Society Award (Formerly the NSB Public Service Award).

Awards are presented during a ceremony held near the NSF headquarters. Several hundred members of the science and education communities—including White House, congressional, scientific society, higher education, and industry officials gather to celebrate the achievements of those awarded during this event.

The Vannevar Bush Award recognizes lifetime contributions to science and public service. This award was created in 1980 by the NSB in memory of Vannevar Bush, who was a part of the creation of the National Science Foundation. The criteria for a candidate to be considered for this award is to be a U.S. citizen and meet two of the three selection criteria: Intellectual Merit, Public Service to the Nation, and Societal Benefits. 

The NSB Science and Society Award (previously known as the Public Service Award) recognizes those who foster public understanding of science and engineering. This award was created in November 1996. Candidates can be individuals or groups that have made great contributions to public knowledge of engineering and science.

The most up to date information can be found here: https://www.nsf.gov/nsb/awards/index.jsp

See also
 The White House
 Office of Science and Technology Policy
 House Committee on Science, Space, and Technology
 Senate Committee on Commerce, Science, and Transportation

References

External links
 Official Website

National Science Foundation
Committees
1950 establishments in the United States
Science policy